Claudine is Claudine Longet's debut LP album. It was her first serious attempt to start a music career after she had appeared on a number of variety shows and released the single Meditation in 1966. Longet's records were part of the effort of Herb Alpert's A&M Records to expand the label's repertoire. The sessions were arranged by Nick De Caro and engineered by Bruce Botnick.  Claudine reached # 11 on the Billboard pop albums chart and earned a RIAA-certified gold record for sales of more than 500,000 copies in the U.S.

Track listing
"A Man and a Woman (Un homme et une femme)" (Pierre Barouh, Francis Lai) — 3:08
"Here, There and Everywhere" (John Lennon, Paul McCartney) — 2:18
"Meditation (Meditação)" (Tom Jobim, Newton Mendonça, Norman Gimbel, Eddy Marnay) — 3:09
"Tu as Beau Sourire" (Michel Jourdan, Armand Canfora,  Joss Baselli) — 2:43
"A Felicidade" (Jobim, Vinícius de Moraes) — 3:35
"Wanderlove" (Mason Williams) — 2:20
"Hello, Hello" (Terry MacNeil, Peter Kraemer) — 2:13
"Sunrise, Sunset" (Jerry Bock, Sheldon Hornick) — 3:12
"Until It's Time for You to Go" (Buffy Sainte-Marie) — 2:18
"My Guy" (William Robinson) — 2:38

Album singles
 Meditation (1967 - #98 pop)/ Sunrise, Sunset
 A Man and a Woman (Un Homme et un Femme)/ Here, There and Everywhere (1967- #126 pop; #19 adult contemporary)
 Hello, Hello (1967 - #91 pop; #8 adult contemporary)/ Wanderlove

Personnel 

Bruce Botnick – Engineer
Nick DeCaro – Arranger
Tommy LiPuma – Producer

1967 debut albums
Claudine Longet albums
Albums produced by Tommy LiPuma
A&M Records albums
French-language albums